Bruno Morri (born 24 May 1946) is a Sammarinese former sports shooter. He competed at the 1972, 1976, 1980 and the 1984 Summer Olympics.

References

1946 births
Living people
Sammarinese male sport shooters
Olympic shooters of San Marino
Shooters at the 1972 Summer Olympics
Shooters at the 1976 Summer Olympics
Shooters at the 1980 Summer Olympics
Shooters at the 1984 Summer Olympics
Place of birth missing (living people)